Barbora Dibelková (born 26 May 1983, in Čáslav) is a Czech race walker.

Achievements

References

External links

1983 births
Living people
People from Čáslav
Czech female racewalkers
Athletes (track and field) at the 2004 Summer Olympics
Olympic athletes of the Czech Republic
World Athletics Championships athletes for the Czech Republic
Sportspeople from the Central Bohemian Region